Danial Farhan Tan is a Singaporean footballer who plays for Balestier Khalsa FC as a forward. He started his career with Woodlands Wellington in 2012.

Club career
Tan started off his professional footballing career in 2012, signing for Woodands Wellington. However, he did not made any appearances for the club. He later went on to Tampines Rovers in 2013 and too, made zero appearances. He was clubless in 2014 but sign for Balestier Khalsa in 2015.

Career statistics

Club

. Caps and goals may not be correct.

References

1994 births
Living people
Singaporean footballers
Singaporean sportspeople of Chinese descent
Association football forwards
Balestier Khalsa FC players